The Minarets are two peaks of the Southern Alps approximately  apart, located in Westland Tai Poutini National Park in the South Island of New Zealand. After the  Mount Elie de Beaumont, they are the northernmost three-thousand-metre peaks in the country and are a few kilometres away from the highest mountains in New Zealand. Most of the other three-thousand-metre peaks in the country are located in the immediate vicinity.

The first ascent was made by Tom Fyfe and Malcolm Ross in 1895.

References 

Southern Alps
Mountains of the West Coast, New Zealand